Sherman Indian High School (SIHS) is an off-reservation boarding high school for Native Americans. Originally opened in 1892 as the Perris Indian School, in Perris, California, the school was relocated to Riverside, California in 1903, under the name Sherman Institute. When the school was accredited by the Western Association of Schools and Colleges in 1971, it became known as Sherman Indian High School.

Operated by the Bureau of Indian Education/Bureau of Indian Affairs and the United States Government Department of the Interior, the school serves grades 9 through 12. The school mascot is the Brave and the school colors are purple and yellow. There are seven dormitory facilities on the SIHS grounds. The male facilities are Wigwam, Ramona, and Kiva. Female facilities are Wauneka, Dawaki, and Winona. The last dorm is a transition dorm, Hogan. In addition to the seven dorms, there is also a set of 13 honor apartments named Sunset. Only four dorms are available for students to live in including Wigwam, Ramona, Wauneka and Winona.

History
According to the Sherman Indian Museum, SIHS was founded by the United States Government in order to assimilate Native Americans into the mainstream society.

SIHS was originally known as the Perris Indian School, which was established in 1892 under the direction of Mr. M. S. Savage. This was the first off-reservation boarding school in California. The enrollment then consisted of Southern California Indian children from the Tule River Agency to San Diego County. Students ranged in age from 5 years old to early 20s. The main subjects taught were agriculture and domestic science.

The  site in Perris, California was at the corner of today's Perris Boulevard and Morgan Street. Due to an inadequate water supply to conduct the primary subjects at the school, a better location was sought. By 1901 a site in the city of Riverside was selected, at the corner of Magnolia Avenue and Jackson Street. On July 19, 1901, the cornerstone was laid for the new school building of Sherman Institute. Perris Indian School remained in operation until December 1904 when the remaining students were transferred to Riverside. It was named after Congressman James S. Sherman, who helped establish funding for the school in 1900.

The Mission Revival Style architecture was considered a novelty when the school was built, and the city promoted the school as one of the landmarks to visit by tourists. To meet earthquake standards, most of the original school buildings were demolished during the 1970s, and new structures were built in their place. The California Native Tribes were required to pay for the demolition and for the new buildings.

During the 2008–09 school year, SIHS administration removed more than 30 staff from their facility, upsetting the students. The students protested, to no effect. Officials stated that there were not enough Bureau of Indian Affairs (BIA) funds to pay the employees that had been let go.

Sherman Indian Museum
The Sherman Museum is currently the school's only original architecture; it was once the school's administration building. The building has been designated a National Historic Landmark and Riverside Landmark number 16.

In 1995 Huell Howser Productions, in association with KCET/Los Angeles, featured Sherman Indian High School in California's Gold.

Sherman Cemetery
Because of Bureau of Indian Affairs policies, students did not return home for several years. Those who died were often buried in the school cemetery.

May 3 marks an old tradition amongst the local tribes where many local reservations decorate their cemeteries with flowers and replace old crosses. Sherman Indian High School designates this as Indian Flower Day.

Demographics and feeder patterns
 students living on Indian reservations make up about 68% of the student body.

As of 1988, Sherman Indian high school was the most common boarding school chosen by the isolated village of Supai, Arizona, which has Havasupai Elementary School as its elementary school. Supai does not have a high school.

Annual events
Every year, in mid-April, Sherman hosts a one-day pow-wow. The event officially ends Sherman's parent-teacher conference week. SIHS holds an annual Talent Show on the Thursday of that week. The Miss Sherman Pageant also occurs during this week annually, traditionally on Friday, the evening before the pow-wow.

Notable faculty and alumni
 Reggie Attache, professional American football player, attended SIHS
 Elmer Busch, professional American football player, attended from 1907–1910
 Jean Fredericks, photographer, attended after receiving grade school education on the Third Mesa Hopi Reservation
 Matthew B. Juan, SIHS graduate, Native American hero of World War I, killed in action
 "Big Chief" Russell Moore, jazz trombonist, graduated 1933
 Bemus Pierce, professional American football player, coached Sherman Braves in 1902 and 1903

See also

 Off-reservation boarding schools operated by the BIE
 Chemawa Indian School
 Flandreau Indian School
 Riverside Indian School
 Off-reservation boarding schools operated by tribes
 Circle of Nations Wahpeton Indian School
 Pierre Indian Learning Center
 Sequoyah Schools
 Saint Boniface Indian School, in Banning, California
American Indian outing programs

References

Further reading

External links

 
 Sherman Indian Museum

Native American boarding schools
High schools in Riverside, California
High schools in Riverside County, California
Native Americans in Riverside County, California
Public high schools in California
National Register of Historic Places in Riverside County, California
1892 establishments in California
Educational institutions established in 1892
Landmarks in Riverside, California
Mission Revival architecture in California
Bureau of Indian Education schools in California
Public boarding schools in the United States
Boarding schools in California
Native American high schools
Native Americans in California